Spencer Charters (March 25, 1875 – January 25, 1943) was an American film actor.  He appeared in more than 220 films between 1920 and 1943, mostly in small supporting roles.

Biography
Charters was born in Duncannon, Pennsylvania. Until around 1890 he worked as a machinist for the Chesapeake Nail Works in Harrisburg, Pennsylvania, and had little interest in acting. He soon appeared on stage after leaving school with a walk-on part, but it wasn't long before he was being given fair-sized roles. He played on Broadway between 1910 and 1929 and was a busy character actor in films during the 1930s and early 1940s. He often portrayed somewhat befuddled judges, doctors, clerks, managers, and jailers.

Charters was married to actress Irene Myers until her death December 22, 1941.

He died by suicide from a mix of sleeping pills and carbon monoxide poisoning. He is buried in Forest Lawn Memorial Park, Glendale, California.

Filmography

References

External links

 
 
 

1875 births
1943 suicides
Male actors from Pennsylvania
American male film actors
American male stage actors
Drug-related suicides in California
People from Perry County, Pennsylvania
Suicides by carbon monoxide poisoning
20th-century American male actors
Burials at Forest Lawn Memorial Park (Glendale)